

Crown
Head of State - Queen Elizabeth II

Federal government
Governor General - Edward Schreyer

Cabinet
Prime Minister -  Pierre Trudeau
Deputy Prime Minister - Allan MacEachen
Minister of Finance - Marc Lalonde
Secretary of State for External Affairs - Allan MacEachen
Secretary of State for Canada - Serge Joyal
Minister of National Defence - Gilles Lamontagne then Jean-Jacques Blais
Minister of National Health and Welfare - Monique Bégin
Minister of Regional Industrial Expansion - Ed Lumley
Minister of the Environment - John Roberts then Charles Caccia
Minister of Justice - Mark MacGuigan
Minister of Transport - Jean-Luc Pépin then Lloyd Axworthy
Minister of Communications - Francis Fox
Minister of Fisheries and Oceans - Pierre de Bané
Minister of Agriculture - Eugene Whelan
Minister of Public Works - Roméo LeBlanc
Minister of Employment and Immigration - Lloyd Axworthy then John Roberts
Minister of Indian Affairs and Northern Development - John Munro
Minister of Energy, Mines and Resources - John Roberts then Charles Caccia

Parliament
See: 32nd Canadian parliament

Party leaders
Liberal Party of Canada - Pierre Trudeau
New Democratic Party- Ed Broadbent
Progressive Conservative Party of Canada - Joe Clark then Erik Nielsen interim then Brian Mulroney

Supreme Court Justices
Chief Justice: Bora Laskin
William McIntyre
Bertha Wilson
Antonio Lamer
Roland Almon Ritchie
John Sopinka
Jean Beetz
Julien Chouinard
Gerald Eric Le Dain

Other
Speaker of the House of Commons - Jeanne Sauvé
Governor of the Bank of Canada - Gerald Bouey
Chief of the Defence Staff - Air General R.M. Withers then General G.C.E. Thériault

Provinces

Premiers
Premier of Alberta - Peter Lougheed
Premier of British Columbia - Bill Bennett
Premier of Manitoba - Howard Pawley
Premier of New Brunswick - Richard Hatfield
Premier of Newfoundland - Brian Peckford
Premier of Nova Scotia - John Buchanan
Premier of Ontario - Bill Davis
Premier of Prince Edward Island - James Lee
Premier of Quebec - René Lévesque
Premier of Saskatchewan - Grant Devine

Lieutenant-governors
Lieutenant-Governor of Alberta - Frank C. Lynch-Staunton
Lieutenant-Governor of British Columbia - Henry Pybus Bell-Irving then Robert Gordon Rogers
Lieutenant-Governor of Manitoba - Pearl McGonigal
Lieutenant-Governor of New Brunswick - George F.G. Stanley
Lieutenant-Governor of Newfoundland and Labrador - William Anthony Paddon
Lieutenant-Governor of Nova Scotia - John Elvin Shaffner
Lieutenant-Governor of Ontario - Jean-Pierre Côté
Lieutenant-Governor of Prince Edward Island - Joseph Aubin Doiron
Lieutenant-Governor of Quebec - Gilles Lamontagne
Lieutenant-Governor of Saskatchewan - Irwin McIntosh then Sylvia Fedoruk

Mayors
Toronto - Art Eggleton
Montreal - Jean Drapeau
Vancouver - Michael Harcourt
Ottawa - Marion Dewar

Religious leaders
Roman Catholic Bishop of Quebec - Cardinal Archbishop Louis-Albert Vachon
Roman Catholic Bishop of Montreal -  Cardinal Archbishop Paul Grégoire
Roman Catholic Bishops of London - Bishop John Michael Sherlock
Moderator of the United Church of Canada - W. Clarke MacDonald

See also
1982 Canadian incumbents
Events in Canada in 1983
1984 Canadian incumbents
Governmental leaders in 1983
 Canadian incumbents by year

1983
Incumbents
Canadian leaders